The 2019 Americas Rugby Challenge or ARCh 2019 was the second edition of the Americas Rugby Challenge, a men's rugby union international tournament for tier 2 teams in North and South America. The second edition was confirmed in June 2019, to be played at the Estadio Cincuentenario in Medellín, Colombia from August 25 to 31.

The competition brings together Rugby Americas North (RAN) and Sudamérica Rugby, following the example of the Americas Rugby Championship (ARC). The Americas Rugby Challenge is officially the ‘B’ competition for the ARC. For the 2019 edition, the host nation, Colombia, was joined by Sudamérica Rugby rivals Paraguay while the Cayman Islands and Mexico represented Rugby Americas North. The Cayman Islands joined the competition after winning a playoff against Guyana, 58–14 in George Town in February 2019. Columbia won the tournament achieving bonus point victories in all three of their matches.

Format
All four nations play each other once in a single-round robin.

Teams

Table

Fixtures

Match day 1

Match day 2

Match day 3

References

Americas Rugby Challenge
Rugby union competitions for national teams
Rugby union competitions in South America
Rugby union competitions in North America
2019 establishments in South America